(5604) 1992 FE is an Aten-type near-Earth minor planet. It was discovered by Robert H. McNaught at the Siding Spring Observatory in Canberra, Australia, on March 26, 1992.

On April 7, 2015 the asteroid passed  from Venus.

See also 
 (10115) 1992 SK

References

External links 
 Lightcurve plot of (5604) 1992 FE, Palmer Divide Observatory, B. D. Warner (2009)
 Asteroid Lightcurve Database (LCDB), query form (info )
 Dictionary of Minor Planet Names, Google books
 Asteroids and comets rotation curves, CdR – Observatoire de Genève, Raoul Behrend
 
 
 

005604
Discoveries by Robert H. McNaught
005604
19920326